Armin Öhri (born September 23, 1978) is a Liechtensteiner writer who was among the winners of the 2014 European Union Prize for Literature. He received it for Die dunkle Muse (The Dark Muse), the first novel of a crime series. Armin Öhri grew up in Ruggell and works in Switzerland. He has been active since 2009. His works are influenced by 19th century crime fiction.

Works 

Das Nachtvolk. Erzählung. Van Eck-Verlag 2009. 
Die Entführung. Erzählung. Gmeiner-Verlag 2010, 
Sinfonie des Todes. Historischer Kriminalroman. Gmeiner-Verlag 2011, 
Die dunkle Muse. Julius Bentheims erster Fall. Historischer Kriminalroman. Gmeiner-Verlag 2012, . Translated into Albanian, Spanish, Italian and Croatian.
Der Bund der Okkultisten. Julius Bentheims zweiter Fall. Historischer Kriminalroman. Gmeiner-Verlag 2014, 
Die Dame im Schatten. Julius Bentheims dritter Fall. Historischer Kriminalroman. Gmeiner-Verlag 2015, 
Die letzte Reise der Hindenburg. Kurzroman. E-Book, Gmeiner-Verlag, 2016 
Professor Harpers Expedition. Historischer Roman. E-Book, Gmeiner-Verlag, 2016 
Liechtenstein. Klein, aber oho Herausgeber. Gmeiner-Verlag, 2016, 
Liechtenstein. Roman einer Nation. Zeitgeschichtlicher Kriminalroman. Gmeiner-Verlang 2016,

References 

Liechtenstein writers
1978 births
Living people